Eurodirect was a short lived British airline founded in 1994. It was based at Bournemouth Airport in England and flew short haul flights to British and European destinations.  After financial problems, the airline ceased all operations on 26 February 1995, after less than a year of flights. 

Eurodirect flew five British Aerospace ATP aircraft under the IATA designation 9R.  The airline maintained several short haul flights from Bournemouth Airport to destinations in Britain and Europe, including London Gatwick, Glasgow and Amsterdam.

Fleet 
BAe ATP
Jetstream 31

See also 
 British Aerospace ATP
 Bournemouth Airport
 List of defunct airlines of the United Kingdom

References

 Shaw, Robbie. "Direct to the Heart of Europe". Air International, Vol. 48. No. 2, February 1995. pp. 112–114. ISSN 0306-5634.

External links 

 Airlines Remembered page on Eurodirect
 Registration information of Eurodirectaircraft
 Picture of a Eurodirect aircraft

Defunct airlines of the United Kingdom
Airlines established in 1994
1994 establishments in the United Kingdom